Brooks Foster (born April 9, 1986) is a former American football wide receiver. He was drafted by the St. Louis Rams in the fifth round of the 2009 NFL Draft. He played college football at North Carolina.

High school 
Foster attended Boiling Springs High School in South Carolina.  He caught 56 passes for 759 yards and seven touchdowns as a senior and caught 35 passes for 500 yards and scored eight touchdowns as a junior.

College career
While redshirting on the Tar Heels football team during his freshman year in 2004–05, Foster walked on to the men's basketball team at North Carolina. As such, he was a member of the 2005 national championship team that gave Coach Roy Williams his first ring.

As a senior at North Carolina in 2008, Brooks caught 30 passes for 334 yards and two touchdowns, playing in 13 games. In 2007 Brooks played in 11 games, with no starts. He was second on team with 417 receiving yards on 29 catches and two touchdowns. In  2006 he played in 12 games with no starts can caught 38 passes for 486 yards and two touchdowns. In 2005, he played in five games but did not record a catch and the previous season, 2004, he redshirted.

Foster holds the school wide receiver record in the bench press (405 lb) and power clean (353 lb).

Professional career

Foster broke Eddie Royal's record for most bench press reps ever for a wide receiver at the NFL combine.

St. Louis Rams
On April 26, 2009, Foster was drafted in the fifth round by the St. Louis Rams. Unfortunately, his rookie season would be cut short after injuring his ankle against the New York Jets during a preseason contest on August 14, 2009. Foster's injury required surgery and subsequently the then rookie was placed on the Injured Reserved list. In spite of the fact that Foster was striving to hang on with the Rams, Foster was waived by St. Louis on August 22, 2010.

New York Jets
On August 24, 2010, the New York Jets claimed Foster off waivers. Foster was later waived by New York on September 4, 2010.

Miami Dolphins
On September 30, 2010, the Miami Dolphins signed Foster to the team's practice squad. He was later waived on August 16, 2011.

Saskatchewan Roughriders
Foster was signed to the Saskatchewan Roughriders practice roster in July 2012.  He played his first game for the Roughriders on Sept 1st, 2012 in the Labour Day Classic against the Winnipeg Blue Bombers. He was released by the Roughriders on April 29, 2013.

References

External links
North Carolina Tar Heels profile
CBSsports profile

1986 births
Living people
People from Boiling Springs, South Carolina
Players of American football from South Carolina
American football wide receivers
Canadian football wide receivers
Players of Canadian football from South Carolina
North Carolina Tar Heels football players
North Carolina Tar Heels men's basketball players
St. Louis Rams players
New York Jets players
Miami Dolphins players
Saskatchewan Roughriders players
American men's basketball players